Elephant Butte is a city in Sierra County, New Mexico, United States, located near Elephant Butte Reservoir and Elephant Butte Lake State Park. The population was 1,431 at the time of the 2010 census.

History
Elephant Butte was named from Elephant Butte, a butte nearby thought to resemble an elephant.

Geography
Elephant Butte is located at  (33.189809, -107.222873).

Government
As of January 2022 the current mayor of Elephant Butte is Phillip Mortensen  while John Mascaro serves as city manager.

Demographics

At the 2010 census there were 1,431 people in 772 households, including 464 families, in the city. The population density was 477.0 people per square mile. There were 1,316 housing units at an average density of 438.7 per square mile. The racial makeup of the city was 92.2% White, 0.3% African American, 0.9% Native American, 0.5% Asian, 2.9% from other races, and 3.2% from two or more races. Hispanic or Latino of any race were 13.6%.

Of the 772 households 7.8% had children under the age of 18 living with them, 53.4% were married couples living together, 4.3% had a female householder with no husband present, and 39.9% were non-families. 9.3% of households had individuals under 18 years and 56.0% had individuals age 65 or older. The average household size was 1.85 and the average family size was 2.31.

The age distribution was 8.7% under the age of 18 and 43% 65 or older. The median age was 62.8 years. For every 100 females, there were 102.2 males.

As of the 2000 census, the median household income was $31,705, and the median family income was $37,344. Males had a median income of $30,809 versus $22,125 for females. The per capita income for the city was $21,345. About 7.4% of families and 10.6% of the population were below the poverty line, including 26.4% of those under age 18 and 5.2% of those age 65 or over.

Education
Truth or Consequences Municipal Schools is the school district for the entire county. Truth or Consequences Middle School and Hot Springs High School, both in Truth or Consequences, are the district's secondary schools.

Notable people
 Crystal Diamond, member of the New Mexico Senate since 2021
 David Parker Ray, kidnapper, torturer, rapist and suspected serial killer

See also

 List of municipalities in New Mexico
 Cibola National Forest
 Apache Kid Wilderness
Fort McRae

References

External links

 Elephant Butte Chamber of Commerce

Cities in New Mexico
Cities in Sierra County, New Mexico